Beth Parks is an American physicist. She is a professor in the Department of Physics and Astronomy at Colgate University.  She serves as the editor-in-chief of the American Journal of Physics.  In addition to her research, Parks supports physics education through multiple channels.

Education and early career
Born in Huntsville, Alabama, Parks attended Virgil I. Grissom High School.  She earned an AB in Physics with a Certificate in Theater and Dance from Princeton University in 1988, an MA (1991) and PhD (1995) in Physics, from the University of California at Berkeley.  She began her teaching career at St. Columbkille High School, in Massachusetts, 1988-89.  After performing post-doctoral research at the Massachusetts Institute of Technology, she began physics at Colgate University in 1997.

Research
Her research has used time-domain terahertz spectroscopy to study single-molecule magnets and GHz resonators made from carbon nanotubes.  She also has ongoing projects to quantify insulation in buildings and to make solar trackers appropriate for developing nations. Her design mounted solar panels so that they were balanced with a leaking bucket of water. The panels pivoted to face the sun as the leaky bucket reduced in weight during the day.

Parks characterized a diffusion demonstration and studied air pollution in Uganda.

Contributions to teaching physics
Parks has taught physics at the university level for over 20 years.  In addition, she co-authored the textbook, Modern Introductory Physics.

She has explored different methods of teaching physics.  For instance, the introductory course on Atoms and Waves was taught in both a standard format and in a "flipped" style.  The flipped classes used videos, multiple choice questions, followed by additional clarification videos.  Even students in the standard class watched the videos and 85% of the students said they would choose another flipped class.

Awards and honors
Fulbright Scholar, Mbarara University of Science and Technology in Uganda

Selected publications
Modern Introductory Physics, 2nd edition, C. H. Holbrow, J. N. Lloyd, J. C. Amato, E. Galvez, and M. E. Parks, Springer, 2010.

"Research-inspired problems for electricity and magnetism," Beth Parks, American Journal of Physics 74, 351 (2006).March 27, 2006 Virtual Journal of Nanoscale Science and Technology http://www.vjnano.org 
"Photon quantum mechanics and beam splitters," C.H. Holbrow, E. Galvez, M. E. Parks, American Journal of Physics, 70, 260 (2002).
"Editorial firsts," Beth Parks, American Journal of Physics 88, 791 (2020).

References 

21st-century American physicists
American women physicists
Colgate University faculty
University of California, Berkeley alumni
Princeton University alumni
People from Huntsville, Alabama
Living people
1966 births
American women academics
21st-century American women scientists